In the Belly of the Dragon is a Canadian comedy science fiction film, directed by Yves Simoneau and released in 1989. The film stars David La Haye as Lou, an aimless slacker who is dissatisfied with his job distributing flyers around the city, and signs up to be a drug testing subject for two mysterious scientists (Monique Mercure and Marie Tifo); meanwhile, his delivery colleagues Steve (Rémy Girard) and Bozo (Michel Côté) must team up to find and rescue him before the medical experiments go horribly wrong.

The cast also includes Andrée Lachapelle, Pierre Curzi, Jean-Louis Millette, Roy Dupuis, Angèle Coutu, Suzanne Champagne and Pierrette Robitaille.

Reception
The film set what was at the time Quebec's all-time record for box office receipts in the first three days of release and was the third-highest-grossing film in Canada for the year with a gross of C$1.16 million.

Award
Paul Dion received a Genie Award nomination for Best Sound Editing at the 11th Genie Awards in 1990.

References

External links
 

1989 films
Canadian science fiction comedy films
Films directed by Yves Simoneau
French-language Canadian films
1980s Canadian films